"Wonderful Dream (Holidays are Coming)" is a song by American recording artist Melanie Thornton. It was written by Thornton, Mitchell Lennox, Julien Nairolf, Ben Naftali, Terry Coffey, Jon Nettlesbey, Rich Airis, and Scott Temper and produced by Lennox and Nairolf. The song was also featured in a Coca-Cola Christmas promotional campaign. It was posthumously released as a single two days after her death in the crash of Crossair Flight 3597.

Track listings
European CD maxi single
"Wonderful Dream (Holidays Are Coming) (Radio Version)" – 3:50
"Wonderful Dream (Holidays Are Coming) (Art-Of-Soul Tight Mix)" – 3:34
"Memories" – 4:22

Charts and certifications

Weekly charts

Year-end charts

Certifications

Joe McElderry version

On November 17, 2013, British singer Joe McElderry released a cover of the song as a single.

Charts

Margaret version
Polish singer Margaret recorded Polish-language version of the song titled "Coraz bliżej święta", which featured the finalists of the sixth season of The Voice of Poland. It was used in Polish Coca-Cola Christmas commercial, and was released for digital download on 3 November 2015. The song reached number 32 in Poland the year it was released, and has re-entered the Polish charts each holiday season since, peaking at number 29 in 2021.

References

External links
 

2000s ballads
2001 singles
2015 singles
American Christmas songs
Margaret (singer) songs
Pop ballads
2001 songs
X-Cell Records singles